Nicolás Miguel Gásperi (born 6 May 1983) is an Argentine professional footballer who plays as a defender for Acassuso.

Career
Gásperi's career started with Puerto Nuevo in 2000. He went on to play in seventy-three games for the club, whilst also scoring five goals in Primera D Metropolitana. Gásperi went up to Primera B Metropolitana in 2003, signing for Brown. One goal in sixty-four matches in two seasons followed. Stints with San Telmo and Luján, of Primera C Metropolitana, then occurred for Gásperi, as the defender appeared ninety times for the two sides. In 2008, Gásperi joined Estudiantes. Two hundred and ten appearances and eight goals came across six campaigns in tier three, with his last goal coming in a win away to Deportivo Armenio on 13 April 2013.

On 30 June 2014, Gásperi moved across Primera B Metropolitana to join Deportivo Morón. He was sent off in his second match for them, receiving a red card after fifty-nine minutes of a fixture with Los Andes. Deportivo Morón won promotion to Primera B Nacional in 2016–17, though Gásperi had departed midway through the season after agreeing terms with former team Brown. He made twenty-three appearances in his second spell. In July 2018, Acassuso completed the signing of Gásperi. His bow arrived on 9 October versus UAI Urquiza, with his opening goal coming days later in a 2–1 loss to Estudiantes; another ex-club of Gásperi's.

Personal life
Gásperi's brother, Federico, also played football at a professional level.

Career statistics
.

References

External links

1983 births
Living people
People from Campana, Buenos Aires
Argentine footballers
Association football defenders
Primera D Metropolitana players
Primera B Metropolitana players
Primera C Metropolitana players
Primera Nacional players
Club Atlético Puerto Nuevo players
Club Atlético Brown footballers
San Telmo footballers
Club Luján footballers
Estudiantes de Buenos Aires footballers
Deportivo Morón footballers
Club Atlético Acassuso footballers
Sportspeople from Buenos Aires Province